

Events

January–March 
 January 3 – Franco-Prussian War – Battle of Bapaume: Prussians win a strategic victory.
 January 18 – Proclamation of the German Empire: The member states of the North German Confederation and the south German states, aside from Austria, unite into a single nation state, known as the German Empire. The King of Prussia is declared the first German Emperor as Wilhelm I of Germany, in the Hall of Mirrors at the Palace of Versailles. Constitution of the German Confederation comes into effect. It abolishes all restrictions on Jewish marriage, choice of occupation, place of residence, and property ownership, but exclusion from government employment and discrimination in social relations remain in effect.
 January 21 – Giuseppe Garibaldi's group of French and Italian volunteer troops, in support of the French Third Republic, win a battle against the Prussians in the Battle of Dijon.
 February 8 – 1871 French legislative election elects the first legislature of the French Third Republic; monarchists (Legitimists and Orleanists) favourable to peace with the German Empire gain a large majority. The National Assembly meets in Bordeaux.
 February 9 – The United States Commission on Fish and Fisheries is founded.
 February 21 – The District of Columbia Organic Act of 1871 is signed into law by U.S. President Ulysses S. Grant.
 February 24 – The Danish Women's Society is founded to promote women's rights in Denmark; on December 15 it adopts the style Dansk Kvindesamfund.
 March 3 – The first American civil service reform legislation is signed into law by U.S. President Ulysses S. Grant, creating the United States Civil Service Commission.
 March 7 – José Paranhos, Viscount of Rio Branco, becomes Prime Minister of the Empire of Brazil, serving for four years.
 March 18 – Origin of the Paris Commune: Troops of the regular French Army, sent by Adolphe Thiers, Chef du pouvoir executive de la République française, to seize cannons stored on the hill of Montmartre, fraternise with civilians and the National Guard, and two army generals are killed.  Regular troops are evacuated to Versailles.
 March 21
 Otto von Bismarck becomes the first Chancellor of the German Empire.
 John Campbell, Marquess of Lorne (whose father, the 8th Duke of Argyll, is the serving Secretary of State for India), marries Princess Louise.
 March 22
 In North Carolina, William Holden becomes the first governor of a U.S. state to be removed from office by impeachment.
 The United States Army issues an order for the abandonment of Fort Kearny, Nebraska.
 March 26 – The Paris Commune is formally established in France.
 March 27 – The first Rugby Union International results in a 1–0 win, by Scotland over England.
 March 29
 The first Surgeon General of the United States (John Maynard Woodworth) is appointed.
 The Royal Albert Hall in London is opened by Queen Victoria; it incorporates a grand organ by Henry Willis & Sons, the world's largest at this time.

April–June 
 April – The Stockholms Handelsbank is founded.
 April 4 – The New Jersey Detective Agency is chartered, and the New Jersey State Detectives are initiated.
 April 10 – In Brooklyn, New York, P.T. Barnum opens his three-ring circus, hailing it as "The Greatest Show on Earth".
 April 20 – U.S. President Ulysses S. Grant signs the Civil Rights Act of 1871.
 April 24 – Servant girl Jane Clouson is murdered in Eltham, England.
 May 4 – The first supposedly Major League Baseball game is played in America.
 May 8 – The first Major League Baseball home run is hit by Ezra Sutton, of the Cleveland Forest Citys.
 May 10 – The Treaty of Frankfurt is signed, confirming the frontiers between Germany and France. The provinces of Alsace and Lorraine are transferred from France to Germany.
 May 11 – The first trial in the Tichborne case begins, in the London Court of Common Pleas.
 May 21
 French government troops enter Paris to overthrow the Commune, beginning "Bloody Week" (Semaine sanglante).
 The first rack railway in Europe, the Vitznau–Rigi Railway on Mount Rigi in Switzerland, is opened.
 May 27 – French government troops massacre 147 Communards from Belleville, at Père-Lachaise Cemetery in Paris.
 May 28 – Paris Commune falls to French government forces.
 June 1 – Bombardment of the Selee River Forts: Koreans attack two United States Navy warships.
 June 10 – United States expedition to Korea: Captain McLane Tilton leads 109 members of the United States Marine Corps in a punitive naval attack on the Han River forts on Ganghwa Island in Korea, resulting in 250 Koreans dying and diplomatic failure to "open up" Korea.
 June 18 – The Universities Tests Act 1871 removes restrictions limiting access to Oxford, Cambridge and Durham universities to members of the Church of England.
 June 29 – Trade unions are legalized in the United Kingdom by the Trade Union Act 1871.

July–September 
 July 13 – The first cat exhibition is held at the Crystal Palace of London.
 July 20
 British Columbia joins the confederation of Canada.
 C. W. Alcock proposes that "a Challenge Cup should be established in connection with the Association", giving birth to the FA Cup for Association football in England.
 July 21–August 26 – The first ever photographs of Yellowstone National Park region are taken by photographer William Henry Jackson, during the Hayden Geological Survey of 1871.
 July 22 – The foundation stone of the first Tay Rail Bridge is laid; the bridge collapses in a storm eight years later.
 July 28 – The Annie becomes the first boat ever launched on Yellowstone Lake, in the Yellowstone National Park region.
 August 7 – Banco de Concepcion, as predecessor of Itau Unibanco, major financial services in South America, founded in Chile.
 August 9 – One of the few known major hurricanes to strike what becomes the US state of Hawaii causes significant damage on Hawai'i and Maui.
 August 29 – The abolition of the han system is carried out in Japan.
 August 31 – Adolphe Thiers becomes President of the French Republic.
 September 2 – Whaling Disaster of 1871: The Comet, a brig used by whalers, becomes the first of 33 ships to be crushed in the Arctic ice by an early freeze. Remarkably, all 1,219 people on the abandoned ships are rescued without a single loss of life.
 September 3 – New York City residents, tired of the corruption of the "Tammany Hall" political machine and "Boss" William M. Tweed, its "Grand Sachem", meet to form the 'Committee of Seventy' to reform local politics.

October–December 
 October 5 – The Società degli Spettroscopisti Italiani (now Società Astronomica Italiana) was established in Rome, the first scientific organisation in the world dedicated to astrophysics.
 October 8 – Four major fires break out on the shores of Lake Michigan in Chicago; Peshtigo, Wisconsin; Holland, Michigan; and Manistee, Michigan. The Great Chicago Fire is the most famous of these, leaving nearly 100,000 people homeless, although the Peshtigo Fire kills as many as 2,500 people, making it the deadliest in United States history.
 October 11 – Heinrich Schliemann begins the excavation of Troy.
 October 12 – The Criminal Tribes Act is enacted by the British Raj in India, naming over 160 communities as "Denotified Tribes", allegedly habitually criminal (it will be repealed in 1949, after Indian independence).
 October 20 – The Royal Regiment of Artillery forms the first regular Canadian army units, when they create two batteries of garrison artillery, which later become the Royal Canadian Artillery.
 October 24 – Chinese massacre of 1871. In Los Angeles' Chinatown, 18 Chinese immigrants are killed by a mob of 500 men.
 October 26 – Liberian President Edward James Roye is deposed in a coup d'état.
 October 27
 British forces march into the Klipdrift Republic and annex the territory as Griqualand West Colony.
 Henri, Count of Chambord, refuses to be crowned "King Henry V of France" until France abandons its tricolor, and returns to the old Bourbon flag.
 Boss Tweed of Tammany Hall is arrested for bribery, ending his grip on New York City.
 c. November – The South Improvement Company is formed in Pennsylvania by John D. Rockefeller and a group of major United States railroad interests, in an early effort to organize and control the American petroleum industry.
 November 5 – Wickenburg Massacre: Six men travelling by stagecoach, in the Arizona Territory, are reportedly murdered by Yavapai people.
 November 7 – The London–Australia telegraph cable is brought ashore at Darwin.
 November 10 – Henry Morton Stanley, Welsh-born correspondent for the New York Herald, locates missing Scottish explorer and missionary Dr. David Livingstone in Ujiji, near Lake Tanganyika, and greets him by saying, "Dr. Livingstone, I presume?"
 November 17
 The National Rifle Association of America is granted a charter by the state of New York.
 George Biddell Airy presents his discovery that astronomical aberration is independent of the local medium.
 December 10 – German chancellor Otto von Bismarck tries to ban Catholics from the political stage, by introducing harsh laws concerning the separation of church and state.
 December 15 – The Deseret Telegraph Company office in Pipe Spring begins service with a message keyed by Ella Stewart. It is the first telegraph sent from Arizona Territory.

 December 19 – The city of Birmingham, Alabama, is incorporated with the merger of three existing towns.
 December 24 – The opera Aida opens in Cairo, Egypt.
 December 25 – Reading F.C. is formed as an Association football club in England.
 December 26 – Thespis, the first of the Gilbert and Sullivan operas, premières. It does modestly well, but the two composers will not collaborate again for four years.

Date unknown 
 In South Africa
 Gold is discovered at Pilgrim's Creek in the Pilgrim's Rest area.
 An  diamond is discovered, resulting in a diamond rush, and the town of New Rush springs up; Colonial Commissioners arrive there on November 17.
 The Harvard Summer School is founded.
 Continental AG is founded as Continental-Caoutchouc und Gutta-Percha Compagnie in Hanover, Germany, on 8th October.
 The Shinto shrine of Izumo-taisha in Japan is designated as an Imperial shrine.
 Modern "neoclassical economics" is initiated by publication of William Stanley Jevons's Theory of Political Economy and Carl Menger's Principles of Economics (Grundsätze der Volkswirtschaftslehre).

Births

January–February 

 January 1 – Manuel Gondra, Paraguayan author and journalist, 21st President of Paraguay (d. 1927)
 January 7 – Émile Borel, French mathematician, politician (d. 1956)
 January 17 – David Beatty, 1st Earl Beatty, British admiral (d. 1936)
 January 30 – Wilfred Lucas, Canadian-born actor (d. 1940)
 February 4 – Friedrich Ebert, President of Germany (d. 1925)
 February 9 – Howard Taylor Ricketts, American pathologist (d. 1910)
 February 18 – Harry Brearley, English inventor (d. 1948)
 February 25 – Lesya Ukrainka (Larysa Petrivna Kosach), Ukrainian writer, an active political, civil, and feminist activist (d. 1913)
 February 27 – Otto Praeger, American postal official, implemented U.S. Airmail (d. 1948)
 February 28 – Manuel Díaz Rodríguez, Venezuelan writer and politician (d. 1927)

March–April 
 March 1 – Ben Harney, American composer and pianist (d. 1938)
 March 4 – Boris Galerkin, Russian mathematician (d. 1945)
 March 5 – Rosa Luxemburg, German politician (d. 1919)
 March 6 – Afonso Costa, Portuguese lawyer, professor, politician and 3-time Prime Minister of Portugal (d. 1937)
 March 12 – Kitty Marion, German-born actress and women's rights activist in England and the United States (d. 1944)
 March 15 – Constantin Argetoianu, 41st Prime Minister of Romania (d. 1955)
 March 17 – Konstantinos Pallis, Greek general (d. 1941)
 March 19 – Schofield Haigh, English cricketer (d. 1921)
 March 24 – Birdie Blye, American pianist (d. 1935)
 March 27 – Heinrich Mann, German writer (d. 1950)
 March 31 – Arthur Griffith, President of Ireland (d. 1922)
 April 4 – Luke McNamee, American admiral (d. 1952)
 April 8 – Clarence Hudson White, American photographer (d. 1925)
 April 12 – Ioannis Metaxas, Prime Minister of Greece (d. 1941)
 April 13 – Jurgis Matulaitis-Matulevičius, Lithuanian author, Roman Catholic archbishop and blessed (d. 1927)
 April 15 – Jonathan Zenneck, German physicist, electrical engineer (d. 1959)

May–June 
 May 2 – Francis P. Duffy, Canadian-born American Catholic priest (d. 1932)
 May 6
 Victor Grignard, French chemist, Nobel Prize in Chemistry laureate (d. 1935)
 Christian Morgenstern, German author (d. 1914)
 May 7 – Gyula Károlyi, 29th Prime Minister of Hungary (d. 1947)
 May 27 – Georges Rouault, French painter, graphic artist (d. 1958)
 June 5 – Nicolae Iorga, 34th Prime Minister of Romania (d. 1940)
 June 11 – Walter Cowan, British admiral (d. 1956)
 June 12 – Ernst Stromer, German paleontologist (d. 1952)
 June 14 – Jacob Ellehammer, Danish inventor (d. 1946)
 June 17 – James Weldon Johnson, American author, politician, diplomat, critic, journalist, poet, anthologist, educator, lawyer, songwriter and early civil rights activist (d. 1938)
 June 18 – Edmund Breese, American actor (d. 1936)
 June 23 – Jantina Tammes, Dutch plant biologist (d. 1947)
 June 26 – Reginald R. Belknap, United States Navy rear admiral (d. 1959)

July–August 

 July 5 – Claus Schilling, German medical researcher and war criminal (d. 1946)
 July 10 – Marcel Proust, French writer (d. 1922)
 July 17 – Lyonel Feininger, German painter (d. 1956)
 July 18 – Sada Yacco, Japanese stage actress (d. 1946)
 July 25 – Richard Ernest William Turner, Canadian soldier (d. 1961)
 August 1 – John Lester, American cricketer (d. 1969)
 August 3 – Augusta Holtz, Polish-American supercentenarian, last surviving person born in 1871 (d. 1986)
 August 12 – Gustavs Zemgals, 2nd President of Latvia (d. 1939)
 August 13 – Karl Liebknecht, German politician (d. 1919)
 August 14 – Guangxu Emperor of China (d. 1908)
 August 19
 Orville Wright, American aviation pioneer, co-inventor of the airplane with brother Wilbur (d. 1948)
 Joseph E. Widener, American art collector (d. 1943)
 August 23 – Sofia Panina, Russian politician (d. 1956)
 August 25 – Nils Edén, 15th Prime Minister of Sweden (d. 1945)
 August 27 – Theodore Dreiser, American writer (d. 1945)
 August 29 – Albert François Lebrun, French politician (d. 1950)
 August 30 – Ernest Rutherford, New Zealand physicist, recipient of the Nobel Prize in Chemistry (d. 1937)

September–October 
 September 1 – J. Reuben Clark, Under Secretary of State for U.S. President Calvin Coolidge (d. 1961)
 September 10
 Thomas Adams, British urban planner (d. 1940)
 Charles Collett, English Great Western Railway chief mechanical engineer (d. 1952)
 September 17 – Eivind Astrup, Norwegian Arctic explorer (d. 1895)
 September 19 – Frederick Ruple, Swiss-born American portrait painter (d. 1938)
 September 24 – Lottie Dod, English athlete (d. 1960)
 September 26 – Winsor McCay, American cartoonist, animator (d. 1934)
 September 27 – Grazia Deledda, Italian writer, Nobel Prize laureate (d. 1936)
 September 28 – Pietro Badoglio, Italian field marshal, prime minister (d. 1956)
 October 2 – Cordell Hull, United States Secretary of State, recipient of the Nobel Peace Prize (d. 1955)
 October 19 – Walter Bradford Cannon, American physiologist (d. 1945)
 October 11 – Harriet Boyd Hawes, American archaeologist (d. 1945)
 October 17 – Dénes Berinkey, 21st Prime Minister of Hungary (d. 1944)
 October 25 – John Gough, British general, Victoria Cross recipient (d. 1915)
 October 30
 Buck Freeman, American baseball player (d. 1949)
 Paul Valéry, French poet (d. 1945)

November–December 
 November 1 – Stephen Crane, American writer (d. 1900)
 November 14 – Wajed Ali Khan Panni, Bengali aristocrat and philanthropist (d. 1936)
 November 23 – William Watt, Australian politician, Premier of Victoria (d. 1946)
 December 9 – Joe Kelley, American Baseball Hall of Famer (d. 1943)
 December 13 – Emily Carr, Canadian artist (d. 1945)
 December 17 – Virginia Fábregas, Mexican actress (d. 1950)

Date unknown 
 Zhang Jinghui, Chinese general and politician, second and final Prime Minister of Manchukuo (d. 1959)
 Sevasti Qiriazi, Albanian educator, women's rights activist (d. 1949)

Deaths

January–June 

 January 8 – José Trinidad Cabañas, Honduran general, president and national hero (b. 1805)
 January 13 – Kawakami Gensai, Japanese swordsman of the Bakumatsu period (b. 1834)
 January 15 – Edward C. Delavan, American temperance movement leader (b. 1793)
 January 19 – Sir William Denison, Governor of New South Wales (b. 1804)
 January 25 – Jeanne Villepreux-Power, French marine biologist (b. 1794)
 January 29 – Samuel Harvey Taylor, 6th Principal of Phillips Academy, Andover, Massachusetts (b. 1807)
 February 10 – Étienne Constantin de Gerlache, 1st Prime Minister of Belgium (b. 1785)
 February 12 – Alice Cary, American poet, sister of Phoebe Cary (b. 1820)
 February 20 – Paul Kane, Irish-born painter (b. 1810)
 February 22 – Sir Charles Shaw, British army officer and police commissioner (b. 1795)
 February 23 – Amanda Cajander, Finnish medical reformer (b. 1827)
 March – Emma Fürstenhoff, Swedish florist (b. 1802)
 March 18 – Augustus De Morgan, English professor of mathematics, mathematician (b. 1806)
 April 7
 Prince Alexander John of Wales (b. April 6, prematurely)
 April 7 – Wilhelm von Tegetthoff, Austrian admiral (b. 1827)
 April 30 – Jane Clouson, teenaged British murder victim (b. 1854)
 May 11 – John Herschel, English astronomer (b. 1792)
 May 12 – Elzéar-Henri Juchereau Duchesnay, Canadian politician (b. 1809)
 May 18 – Constance Trotti, Belgian salonnière, culture patron (b. 1800)
 May 23 – Jarosław Dąbrowski, Polish general (b. 1836)
 June 9 – Anna Atkins, British botanist (b. 1799)

July–December 

 July 5 – Cristina Trivulzio Belgiojoso, Italian noble, patriot, writer and journalist (b. 1808)
 July 6 – Castro Alves, Brazilian poet and playwright (b. 1847)
 July 15 – Tad Lincoln, youngest son of American President Abraham Lincoln (b. 1853)
 July 31 – Phoebe Cary, American poet, sister to Alice Cary (b. 1824)
 August 9 – John Paterson, politician in the New South Wales Legislative Assembly (b. 1831)
 September 16 – Jan Erazim Vocel, Czech poet, archaeologist, historian and cultural revivalist (b. 1803)
 September 20 – John Patteson, Anglican bishop, missionary (martyred) (b. 1827)
 September 21 – Charlotte Elliott, English hymnwriter (b. 1789)
 September 23 – Louis-Joseph Papineau, Canadian politician (b. 1786)
 October 4 – Sarel Cilliers, Voortrekker leader, preacher (b. 1801)
 October 7 – Sir John Burgoyne, British field marshal (b. 1782)
 October 16 – Martha Hooper Blackler Kalopothakes, American missionary, journalist, translator (b. 1830)
 October 18 – Charles Babbage, English mathematician, inventor (b. 1791)
 October 29 – Andrea Debono, Maltese trader and explorer (b. 1821)
 November 2 – Athalia Schwartz, Danish writer, journalist and educator (b. 1821)
 November 22 – Oscar James Dunn, Lieutenant Governor of Louisiana (b. 1825)
 December 21 – Luise Aston, German author, feminist (b. 1814)
 December 28 – John Henry Pratt, English clergyman, mathematician (b. 1809)

References 

 Appleton's Annual Cyclopedia...for 1871 (1873), comprehensive collection of facts online edition